Femme refers to a type of lesbian culture.

Femme or La Femme may also refer to:

Places
 Femme, Newfoundland and Labrador, a place in Canada
 La Femme (beach), a women-only beach in Egypt

People with the name
 Laura Bettinson, whose stagename is "FEMME"
 Magda Femme, a musician's stagename

Arts, entertainment, and media
 Kamen Rider Femme, a character in the Kamen Rider series
 La Femme (band), a French band
 La Femme (TV series), a television series in Singapore
 La Femme (magazine), a French magazine (1879–1937)

Other uses
 Dodge La Femme, a 1955 American automobile